Večeřa (feminine: Večeřová) is a Czech surname. Notable people with the surname include:

 Ivana Večeřová (born 1979), Czech basketball player
 Karel Večeřa (born 1955), Czech football manager

See also
 

Czech-language surnames